Asem Roja Devi (born 15 April 2000) is an Indian footballer who plays as a defender for Indian Women's League club Kickstart FC and the India women's national team.

Career 
As the Indian Women's League launched in year 2016, she played for FC Pune City for the first season of the league. She played five matches and scored a goal. In the next season, for 2017–18, she played for Eastern Sporting Union and scored 2 goals. For the 2019–20 season she played for the Kryphsa F.C. and scored 2 goals in 7 matches.

Honours

India
 SAFF Women's Championship: 2019
 South Asian Games Gold medal: 2019

KRYPHSA
Indian Women's League runner-up: 2019–20

Manipur
 Senior Women's National Football Championship: 2021–22
 National Games Gold medal: 2022

References

External links 
 Asem Roja Devi at All India Football Federation
 

2000 births
Footballers from Manipur
Living people
Indian women's footballers
India women's international footballers
India women's youth international footballers
Sportswomen from Manipur
Women's association football defenders
Eastern Sporting Union players
Kryphsa F.C. Players
Indian Women's League players
South Asian Games gold medalists for India
South Asian Games medalists in football